Bad Monkey may refer to:

 Bad Monkey (novel), a 2013 novel by Carl Hiaasen
 Bad Monkey (TV series), a TV series created by Bill Lawrence based on Hiaasen's novel
 Bad Monkey (album), an album by Iron Mike Norton

See also
Bad Monkeys, a 2007 novel by Matt Ruff